Psyllium or Psyllion, or Psylleium or Psylleion (Ψύλλειον), or Psillium or Psillion, or Psylla (Ψύλλα), was a fortified emporium on the coast of ancient Bithynia located on the Pontus Euxinus between Crenides and Tium. The Tabula Peutingeriana erroneously calls it Scylleum.

Its site is located near Ağva in Asiatic Turkey.

References

Populated places in Bithynia
Former populated places in Turkey
History of Istanbul Province